Bertha of Milan or Bertha of Luni (c. 997-c. 1040), was a duchess of Turin by marriage to Ulric Manfred II of Turin, and regent for her daughter Adelaide of Susa in 1033.

She is sometimes identified with the Bertha who was married to Arduin of Ivrea.

Life
Although it is known that Bertha was a member of the Obertenghi dynasty, there is some debate about who her parents were. Her father is often said to be Oberto II, but others argue that Bertha's father was in fact Otbert III of Milan.

By 1014 at the latest, Bertha had married Ulric Manfred (that year, Emperor Henry II confirmed their joint donation to the abbey of Fruttuaria). Her dowry included lands in the counties of Tortona, Parma and Piacenza.

In May 1028 with her husband, Ulric Manfred, Bertha founded the convent of Santa Maria at Caramagna. The following year, in July 1029, along with her husband and his brother, Bishop Alric of Asti, Bertha founded the Benedictine abbey in of S. Giusto in Susa, which housed the relics of Saint Just (San Giusto), presumed to be a martyred monk from the abbey of Novalesa. The church of the Abbey of San Giusto is now Susa Cathedral.

After Ulric Manfred's death (in December 1033 or 1034), Bertha briefly acted as regent for their daughter, Adelaide of Susa.

In 1037 Bertha captured envoys who wished to cross the Alps from Piedmont to Champagne, thus foiling a conspiracy against Emperor Conrad II. Conrad II rewarded Bertha for her part in suppressing the rebellion against him by issuing an imperial diploma which confirmed her donations to the abbey of S. Giusto in Susa.

Issue
With Ulric Manfred, Bertha had three daughters: 
Adelaide
Immilla
Bertha

References
H. Bresslau, Jahrbücher des Deutschen Reichs unter Konrad II., 2 vols. (1884), accessible online at: archive.org
C.W. Previté-Orton, The Early History of the House of Savoy (1000-1233) (Cambridge, 1912), accessible online at:  archive.org
G. Sergi, ‘Una grande circoscrizione del regno italico: la marca arduinica di Torino,’ in Studi Medievali XII (1971), 637-712
 C. Violante, ‘Quelques caractéristiques des structures familiales en Lombardie, Emilie, et Toscane aux Xle et XII siècles,’ in G. Duby and J. le Goff, eds., Famille et parenté dans l’Occident médiéval (Paris, 1977), pp. 87–148.
 M. Nobili, ‘Formarsi e definirsi dei nomi di famiglia nelle stirpi marchionali dell’Italia centro-settentrionale: il caso degli Obertenghi,’ in Nobiltà e chiese nel medioevo e altri saggi, ed. C. Violante (Rome, 1993), pp. 77–95.
G.C. Alessio, Cronaca di Novalesa (Turin 1982).

External links
Medieval Lands Project: Northern Italy, 900–1100.
Epistolae: Medieval Women’s Latin Letters: Bertha of the Obertenghi (brief biography of Bertha and translations of some legal documents issued by her)
Bertha von Luni (c.980-1037) (in German)

Notes

Italian countesses
11th-century women rulers
11th-century Italian women
11th-century Italian nobility
Nobility from Turin
People from Lombardy
990s births
1040s deaths
Year of birth uncertain
Year of death uncertain